Chun Bo-geun (born August 23, 2002) is a South Korean actor. He first garnered attention in a KTF commercial in 2008, then began his career as a child actor in 2009. Chun has starred in the films Hello Ghost (2010) and The Grand Heist (2012), as well as the television series Wish Upon a Star (2010) and The Queen's Classroom (2013).

Filmography

Film

Television series

Variety show

Music video

Awards and nominations

References

External links 
 
 
 

2002 births
Living people
People from Seongnam
South Korean male film actors
South Korean male television actors
South Korean male child actors